Royden Wood (16 October 1930 – 7 February 2023) was an English footballer who played as a goalkeeper, notably for Leeds United.

Early life
Wood was born in Wallasey on 16 October 1930. During World War Two, he served with the RAF in the Far East. Wood also played cricket.

Career
Having played for West Cheshire League side Harrowby as a youngster, Wood joined Football League Third Division North side New Brighton in the 1950–51 season, shortly before the club were expelled from the Football League. After holding multiple jobs in the North West of England, including loading lorries in Oxton in Birkenhead, he joined Lancashire Combination side Clitheroe in 1951, before being signed by Football League Second Division side Leeds United in May 1952.

Wood made his debut for Leeds United on 24 October 1953 in a match against Derby County, and went on to make 203 appearances in total for the club, 116 of which came in the First Division, the top tier of English football, following Leeds' promotion in 1956. He retired in 1959 at the age of 28.

Style of play
Wood played as a goalkeeper. He was known for his athleticism and acrobatic displays.

Retirement and death
Following his retirement in 1959, Wood became the manager of a betting shop and was a member of Professional Footballers' Association management committee.

Wood died in February 2023, at the age of 92.

References

1930 births
2023 deaths
People from Wallasey
English footballers
Footballers from Cheshire
Association football goalkeepers
English Football League players
New Brighton A.F.C. players
Clitheroe F.C. players
Leeds United F.C. players
Military personnel from Merseyside
Royal Air Force airmen
Royal Air Force personnel of World War II